The Church of Scientology publicly classifies itself as a religion, but scholars and other observers regard it as a business, because the organization operates more like a for-profit business than a religious institution. Some scholars of sociology working in religious studies consider it a new religious movement. Overall, as stated by Stephen A. Kent, Scientology can be seen as a "multi-faceted transnational corporation that has religion as only one of its many components. Other components include political aspirations, business ventures, cultural productions, pseudo-medical practices, pseudo-psychiatric claims, and (among its most devoted members who have joined the Sea Organization), an alternative family structure."

Business practices

Several of the Church's practices resemble business operations, including paying recruiters a cut of the money made from the people they attract and the franchising network that results in large revenues for the highest levels of the Church. Such activities distinguish Scientology from other religious organizations.  The Church pays 10% commissions to recruiters, called Field Staff Members (FSMs), on new recruits they bring in who take a course or receive counseling. In addition, Church of Scientology franchises/missions, pay the Church roughly 10% of their gross income.  The Church charges for auditing and other Church-related courses required for advancing through the ranks of Scientology.  These programs can run to tens or hundreds of thousands of dollars.

The Scientology Bridge to Total Freedom consists of one half relating to levels of higher states of spiritual existence, and the other half the skills relating to helping another reach that level.  Training is described as "50% of the route".

The Religious Technology Center maintains strict control over the use of Scientology symbols, icons, and names. It claims copyright and trademark over the "Scientology cross", and its lawyers have threatened lawsuits against individuals and organizations who have published these protected images without permission in books and on websites.  Because of this, it is difficult for individual groups to attempt to practice Scientology publicly without any affiliation or connection to the "official" Church of Scientology. Scientology has sued a number of individuals who attempted to set up their own "auditing" practices, using copyright and trademark law to shut these competitors down.

Writing in Skeptic magazine, Michael Shermer contrasted such practices with mainstream religions: "Envision converting to Judaism but having to pay for courses in order to hear the story of Abraham and Isaac, Noah and the flood, or Moses and the Ten Commandments. Or imagine joining the Catholic Church but not being told about the crucifixion and the resurrection until you have reached Operating Theological Level III, which can only be attained after many years and tens of thousands of dollars in church-run courses."

The German government takes the view that Scientology is a commercial enterprise, and Belgium, France, Ireland, Luxembourg, Philippines, Israel and Mexico remain unconvinced that Scientology is a religion.

Other countries have recognised Scientology as a religion.  An Australian Government Inquiry into Charities in 2001 found that the 1983 High Court case which found Scientology to be a religion, and also defined religion for the Constitution, used as the standard to determine what organisations are charitable.

L. Ron Hubbard and Scientology as a business
Religious studies professor Hugh Urban and journalist Janet Reitman, amongst others, have noted that L. Ron Hubbard, the founder of the Church of Scientology, decided to market the practice as a religion for practical reasons.  Harlan Ellison reported being present when the idea for creating a new religion was first discussed: "Lester del Rey then said half-jokingly, 'What you really ought to do is create a religion because it will be tax-free,' and at that point everyone in the room started chiming in with ideas for this new religion. So the idea was a Gestalt that Ron caught on to and assimilated the details. He then wrote it up as 'Dianetics: A New Science of the Mind' and sold it to John W. Campbell Jr., who published it in Astounding Science Fiction in 1950." Hubbard had a different origin story and stated that Dianetics had been researched during the years 1945-50 and it was initially presented as a science, however religious ideas were added into the book Science of Survival published in 1951. After the commercial failure of the Dianetics Foundation and disputes over the direction of the subject, Hubbard revisited the possibility of classifying his philosophical teachings as a religion.  In a 1953 letter, Hubbard wrote that "the religion angle" seemed to make sense as "a matter of practical business".

The Founding Church of Scientology of Washington, D.C., had obtained tax-exempt status in 1956 on the claim that it was "a corporation organized and operated exclusively for religious purposes, no part of the earnings of which inures to any individual".  That status was revoked in 1958, on the grounds (as argued by the U.S. Department of Justice in subsequent proceedings) that the Church's "most extensive and significant activities are directed towards the earnings of substantial fees" and "the founder of the organisation L. Ron Hubbard remains in complete control and receives substantial remuneration and perquisites both from the taxpayer and a network of affiliates". The findings of fact in the case included that Hubbard had personally received over $108,000 ($600,000 in 2012 value) from the Church and affiliates over a four-year period, over and above the percentage of gross income (usually 10%) he received from Church-affiliated organizations.  In addition, the Church had paid for Hubbard's car and for his personal residence, Mary Sue Hubbard had made over $10,000 renting property to the Church, and while the $3,242 paid to Hubbard's daughter Kay had been "generally designated as salary or wages", "the record is devoid of any evidence showing services performed by Miss Hubbard for [the Church]."  The Court of Claims concluded "What emerges from these facts is the inference that the Hubbard family was entitled to make ready personal use of the corporate earnings."  More recently the IRS granted religious recognition and full tax deductibility to the Church of Scientology in the US in 1993.

Per policy set by Hubbard, The Church of Scientology is prohibited from providing free services, requiring compensation or some other form of volunteer commitment in exchange.

Professional auditors

According to the Church of Scientology, Field Auditors usually make a significant amount of their income from 15% FSM (Field Staff Member) Commissions. This is from referring their preclears to nearby (larger) Class V orgs or to the Sea Orgs for advanced training and processing.

Field Auditors also charge for auditing services, which the Church of Scientology says can also generate significant income:

Church of Scientology-owned properties 
The church owns approximately 12 million square feet of property, with Hollywood at the center, and twenty-six properties worth 400 million. In Clearwater, Florida, is the church's spiritual headquarters, where the church possesses 68 parcels of land worth 168 million. Buildings in other countries are typically restored architectural landmarks. The church also owns a 500-acre compound in Southern California, a cruise ship called the Freewinds and a 64,000 square-foot medieval-style castle and resort in South Africa.

The church also owns historic buildings, including the 1927 hotel Château Élysée, remodeled as the Celebrity Center International, the 1923 Christie Hotel on Hollywood Boulevard which is now the Church of Scientology Information Center, a community center in South L.A., (a 1930s art deco building), and the Braley building in Pasadena, now a church, constructed in 1906 for Edgar Braley's bicycle emporium. In 2016, the church opened the Scientology Media Productions, previously the KCET studios. It was purchased from KCET in 2011 for 42 million dollars and preserved as a Los Angeles historic-cultural monument. Although church spokesperson Karin Pouw says that restoring buildings of historical significance is a way that the church "gives back to the community", according to LA Weekly, former high-ranking Scientology officials claim that profit is the main reason why the studio was built, while the church maintains its tax-free status.

See also
 World Institute of Scientology Enterprises
 Hubbard College of Administration International
 Sterling Management Systems
 List of Scientology organizations
  Scientology status by country
 Symbols of Scientology

References

Further reading
 

Scientology and society
Criticism of Scientology
Scientology-related controversies